Oak Glen may refer to:

 Oak Glen, Humboldt County, California
 Oak Glen, San Bernardino County, California
 Oak Glen, New Jersey
 Oak Glen (Portsmouth, Rhode Island), a historic house
 Oak Glen High School, New Cumberland, West Virginia